This page provides the summaries of the matches of the qualifying rounds for the group stage of the 2010 CAF Champions League.

Preliminary round
This is a knockout stage of the 52 teams that did not receive byes to the first round.

First legs: 12–14 February 2010; Second legs: 26–28 February 2010.

APR won 3 – 2 on aggregate and advanced to the first round.

Djoliba won 1 – 0 on aggregate and advanced to the first round.

Aggregate 2 – 2. ASC Linguère won the penalty shootout and advanced to the first round.

Ismaily won 2 – 0 on aggregate and advanced to the first round.

US Stade Tamponnaise won 5 – 2 on aggregate and advanced to the first round.

Africa Sports advanced to the first round after the Benin representative was withdrawn.

Raja Casablanca won 4 –2 on aggregate and advanced to the first round.

Petro de Luanda won 9 – 3 on aggregate and advanced to the first round.

Aggregate 2 – 2. Club Africain advanced on the away goals rule to the first round.

JS Kabylie won 5 – 1 on aggregate and advanced to the first round.

Gazelle FC won 3 – 2 on aggregate and advanced to the first round.

Al-Merreikh won 4 – 2 on aggregate and advanced to the first round.

Espérance ST won 5 – 4 on aggregate and advanced to the first round.

ASFA Yennega won 6 – 1 on aggregate and advanced to the first round.

Curepipe Starlight won 3 – 2 on aggregate and advanced to the first round.

Aggregate 2 – 2. Gaborone United advanced on the away goals rule to the first round.

Saint Eloi Lupopo won 4 – 2 on aggregate and advanced to the first round.

Gunners won 6 – 1 on aggregate and advanced to the first round.

Ittihad won 8 – 1 on aggregate and advanced to the first round.

Difaa El Jadida won 3 – 0 on aggregate and advanced to the first round.

Zanaco won 4 – 1 on aggregate and advanced to the first round.

Union Douala advanced to the first round after the São Tomé and Príncipe representative was withdrawn.

ES Sétif won 4 – 3 on aggregate and advanced to the first round.

Aggregate 4 – 4. Tiko United won the penalty shootout and advanced to the first round.

Supersport United won 5 – 3 and advanced to the first round.

Ferroviário Maputo won 9 – 4 on aggregate and advanced to the first round.

First round
This is a knock-out stage of 32 teams; the 26 teams advancing from the preliminary round, and 6 teams that received byes to this round.

First legs: 19–21 March 2010; Second legs: 2–5 April 2010.

TP Mazembe won 2 – 1 on aggregate and advanced to the second round.

Aggregate 1 – 1. Djoliba won the penalty shootout and advanced to the second round.

Ismaily won 3 – 2 on aggregate and advanced to the second round.

Al-Hilal Omdurman won 4 – 1 on aggregate and advanced to the second round.

Petro de Luanda won 2 – 1 on aggregate and advanced to the second round.

 

 
JS Kabylie won 2 – 1 on aggregate and advanced to the second round.

 

 
Al-Merreikh won 3 – 1 on aggregate and advanced to the second round.

 

 
Espérance ST won 7 –2 on aggregate and advanced to the second round.

 
 

 
Gaborone United won 6 – 0 on aggregate and advanced to the second round.

 

 
Dynamos won 2 – 0 on aggregate and advanced to the second round.

 

 
Al-Ahly won 2 – 1 on aggregate and advanced to the second round.

 

Aggregate 2 – 2. Ittihad won the penalty shootout and advanced to the second round.

 

 
Zanaco won 2 – 1 on aggregate and advanced to the second round.

 

 
ES Sétif won 7 – 0 on aggregate and advanced to the second round.

 

 
Aggregate 3 – 3. Heartland advanced on the away goals rule to the second round.

 

 
Supersport United won 3 – 2 on aggregate and advanced to the second round.

Second round
This is a knock-out stage of the 16 teams that advanced from the first round; winners will advance to the group stage, with the losers advancing to the CAF Confederation Cup.

First legs: 23–25 April 2010; Second legs 7–9 May 2010.

 

 
TP Mazembe won 4 – 0 on aggregate and advanced to the group stage.

 

 
Ismaily won 4 – 1 on aggregate and advanced to the group stage.

 

 
JS Kabylie won 3 – 2 on aggregate and advanced to the group stage.

 

 
Espérance ST won 4 – 1 on aggregate and advanced to the group stage.

 

 
Dynamos won 4 – 2 on aggregate and advanced to the group stage.

 

 
Al-Ahly won 3 – 2 on aggregate and advanced to the group stage.

 

 
ES Sétif won 3 – 2 on aggregate and advanced to the group stage.

 

 
Heartland won 4 – 2 on aggregate and advanced to the group stage.

External links
 Results and fixtures

Qualifying rounds